The National College of Business and Arts or NCBA is a private educational institution in the Philippines with campuses located in Cubao, Fairview and Taytay.

NCBA Collegiate Department offers degree programs in the Arts, Sciences, Business and Education as well as Diploma programs. NCBA also offers Graduate degrees in Master in Business Administration and Master in Public Administration.

History

Established in 1967–68, at the corner of R. Papa and Lepanto streets in Sampaloc, Manila between two giants in Philippine private education: University of the East with its mammoth population of 65,000 and Far Eastern University with its enrollment of 47,000. A small building was erected to house a small school — the National College of Business and Arts. Today the NCBA has three campuses, two in Quezon City and one in Rizal.

NCBA was founded by the late Dr. Doroteo S. Pasion, a well-known educator (former dean of commerce of San Beda College, former CPA review director of the University of the East, and former president of PSBA), lawyer, accountant, author, and civic leader. Pasion launched NCBA as a public service, with others who believed in the NCBA concept: Col.Rafael Q. Yap-Diangco, Atty. Jose R. Torres, Jr., Mrs. Gloria C. Meñez, and Mrs. Lourdes L. Sarabia

Keeping to its founder's vision, NCBA opted to remain as a specialized school and a gives a quality education  its growth was measured and steady through the years. From that small edifice along R. Papa Street, NCBA slowly expanded its academic programs and facilities with the single purpose of the nation type of educated manpower it needs for its development and well-being.

When NCBA opened in 1968, its offerings were limited to the following courses: Bachelor of Science in Business Administration, Bachelor of Arts, two-year course in Secretarial Administration, and its own CPA review. The NCBA High School was opened in school year 1973–1974 followed by additional offerings of short terminal courses in Cooperative, Salesmanship, Bookkeeping and Accounting, and Small business Management in 1974–1975.

2010s
Effective January 2010, Assistant Vice President for finance and Director, Mr. Cesar C. Meñez, became the school President while, Mr. Edwin P. Torres, and officer-in-charge at NCBA Taytay, became the vice-president for finance.

NCBA Taytay employed Ester Pasion-David as the new officer-in-charge. Pasion-David is the eldest daughter of the founder and first president of the NCBA. She has a Bachelor of Science in Business Administration, major in accounting, from the University of the Philippines-Diliman. Soon after Pasion-David did the CPA Licensure Examination.

She started her career at the Philippine National Bank then migrated to United States and worked as a staff accountant at Avon Products in New York City then went to California and worked as an Accounting and HR manager for Alcatel. Her last job was with TRI-FAB Associates as a Controller. Pasion-David also co-authored different accounting books.

Last 2016, Atty. Concepcion Nancy T. Pasion, became the next president of this educational institution. Cesar C. Meñez also died on the same year.

Golden anniversary
In February 2017, NCBA celebrated their 50th founding anniversary, with a new slogan, Vision and Mission.

Athletics
The Wildcats are the varsity athletes who compete in the sport of  basketball, volleyball, badminton, taekwondo, cheerleading, track and field, chess, billiards and swimming. These are student-athletes who represent the school in the following athletic leagues: UCLAA, AAPS, QCAA & PISCUAA. National College of Business and Arts is one of the founders of Universities and Colleges of Luzon Athletic Association UCLAA

Alumni
 Coco Martin – Actor ABS-CBN & Star Magic, Born: Rodel Luis Pacheco Nacianceno on 
 Rick Stryker (Edwin Logina) – Coliseum announcer

References
National College of Business and Arts
Commission on Higher Education

External links

National College of Business and Arts official website

Business schools in the Philippines
Universities and colleges in Quezon City
Universities and colleges in Rizal
Educational institutions established in 1960
1960 establishments in the Philippines